Wrong is the fourth full-length album by Canadian punk rock band Nomeansno. It was released in 1989 through Alternative Tentacles record label.

Overview
Wrong was described by drummer John Wright as the band's "most popular album by a country mile".  When asked to speculate as to the reasons why Wrong enjoyed such relative success, John Wright attributed it to the mainstream success of Nirvana and the rising popularity of alternative music:

Reception
The Collector's Guide to Heavy Metal called it the band's best album, and rated the album as a 10 out of 10, stating, "Wrong was the mightiest merger between the hateful aggression of punk and the discipline of heavy metal."  Sean Carruthers, critic for Allmusic, declared that the album was the band's masterpiece, and features "some of the most complex instrumentation you're ever likely to find in good ol' punk rawk."

In 2021, the album was named the public vote winner of the Polaris Heritage Prize at the 2021 Polaris Music Prize.

Track listing
Side one
 "It's Catching Up"  – 3:29
 "The Tower"  – 5:11
 "Brainless Wonder"  – 1:34
 "Tired of Waiting"  – 1:47
 "Stocktaking"  – 3:05
 "The End of All Things"  – 5:10
Side two
 "Big Dick"  – 3:15
 "Two Lips, Two Lungs and One Tongue"  – 1:46
 "Rags and Bones"  – 5:05
 "Oh No! Bruno!"  – 3:06
 "All Lies"  – 6:27

CD reissue bonus tracks
 "Life in Hell"  – 3:54
 "I Am Wrong"  – 7:01

2005 CD reissue bonus tracks
  "State of Grace" – 5:29
 "End of the World" – 3:28

Personnel
 Rob Wright – bass, guitar, and vocals 
 John Wright – drums, percussion, and vocals
 Andy Kerr (credited as "None of your fucking business") – guitar, bass, and vocals 
 Guests on "The End of All Things" – Mark Critchley (orchestra bells), Danielle Gagnier (vocals)
 Produced by Nomeansno, Cecil English and Craig Bougie. Recorded at Profile Studios, Vancouver, British Columbia, Canada, summer 1989

References

1989 albums
Alternative Tentacles albums
Nomeansno albums